"Mine Smell Like Honey" is a song by American alternative rock band R.E.M. It was released as the second single from their fifteenth and final studio album Collapse into Now on January 18, 2011.

Formats and track listings
 Digital download (United States)
 "Mine Smell Like Honey" – 3:11

Charts

References

2011 singles
Songs written by Peter Buck
Song recordings produced by Peter Buck
Songs written by Michael Stipe
Song recordings produced by Michael Stipe
Song recordings produced by Jacknife Lee
Song recordings produced by Mike Mills
Songs written by Mike Mills
Warner Records singles
R.E.M. songs
2011 songs
Black-and-white music videos